Dejan Vidić (born 10 August 1993) is a professional footballer who plays as a forward for IMT.

References

External links
 
 
 

1993 births
Living people
Sportspeople from Peja
Serbian footballers
Association football forwards
Serbian SuperLiga players
Serbian First League players
FK Zemun players
RFK Grafičar Beograd players
FK Zlatibor Čajetina players
FK Napredak Kruševac players
FK Karađorđe Topola players